Mike Roby born 2 April 1986 in St Helens, Merseyside, England was a professional rugby league footballer for the Sheffield Eagles. He also previously played for St. Helens in the Super League.

References

External links
(archived by web.archive.org) Sheffield Eagles profile
Saints Heritage Society profile

1986 births
Living people
English rugby league players
Rugby league centres
Rugby league players from St Helens, Merseyside
Sheffield Eagles players
St Helens R.F.C. players